Francis Piggott may refer to:

Sir Francis Taylor Piggott (1852–1925), British judge and author
Francis Pigott Stainsby Conant (1809–1863), British politician